Collab Group is a membership organisation representing a network of 29 colleges and college groups of further education in the United Kingdom. 

Collab Group offers services to both public and private sector clients. They work with their members to deliver nationwide apprenticeship and training services to large employers, as well as consultation services relating to skills and education.  They offer commercial training services for organisations looking to bring new talent into their business, or who wish to upskill or retrain their existing workforce. They support employers in critical industries to make the most of their apprenticeship levy as they work in partnership to strategically plan their current and future talent needs.

The group changed its name from the 157 Group in October 2016, having been established under its former name in 2006. Its creation was announced at that year's Association of Colleges annual conference chaired by the then Secretary of State for Education Alan Johnson, with its former name taken from the 157th paragraph of a British government paper on education, The Foster Report (formally the Review of the future role of FE colleges), published a year previously.

Members

References

External links

Further education colleges in the United Kingdom
Educational organisations based in the United Kingdom